Jimmy Vicaut (born 27 February 1992 in Bondy, Seine-Saint-Denis) is a French sprinter who specializes in the 100 and 200 metres. His personal best of 9.86 in the 100 m is the joint second fastest time of any European athlete.

Biography
Vicaut was born to a French father and an Ivorian mother.
He began athletics at the age of ten years and has specialized in the sprint. He won the bronze medal at the 2010 World Junior Championships in Athletics in Moncton, Canada and promptly travelled to Barcelona to help the French men's 4 x 100 metres relay team to the gold medal at the 2010 European Athletics Championships.

Vicaut's junior personal best over 100 m, 10.07 seconds, is the fourth fastest time ever run by a European junior, behind only Christophe Lemaitre (10.04), Adam Gemili (10.05) and Dwain Chambers (10.06).

At the French national championships in Albi on 29 July 2011, Vicaut finished second behind Christophe Lemaitre, tying his personal best of 10.07 sec. Lemaitre set a new French national record with 9.92 sec.

At the 2011 World Championships in Daegu, Vicaut became only the second junior to ever run in a World Championship 100 m final, after Darrel Brown in 2003. Vicaut finished sixth with 10.27 sec, while his fellow countryman Lemaitre finished fourth with 10.19 sec.

At the 2012 Summer Olympics, Vicaut was part of France's 4×100 m relay team that claimed the Bronze medal.

On 13 July 2013, at the French national championships in Paris, Vicaut won the title in 9.95 sec.,a personal best.

At the 2013 World Championships in Moscow, Vicaut took part in three events—the 100 metres, 200 metres and 4 × 100 metres relay. He was eliminated in the semi-finals of the 100 and 200 metres events, while his relay team did not advance to the final from the heats.

In 2015, Vicaut equalled the European 100m record time of 9.86 that Portugal’s Francis Obikwelu had set almost 11 years before at the Olympic Games in Athens.  That time also broke the French national record of 9.92 set by Lemaitre in 2011.

In June 2016, ahead of the Rio Summer Olympics, Vicaut equalled again his 9.86 time on the 100 metre dash at the Pro Athlé Tour meeting in Montreuil.

His younger brother, Willy, also an athlete, competes in the shot put.

Personal best

References

External links

FFA profile for Jimmy Vicaut
France’s Vicaut shows off Moncton medal credentials
 
 

1992 births
Living people
Sportspeople from Bondy
French sportspeople of Ivorian descent
French male sprinters
Athletes (track and field) at the 2012 Summer Olympics
Athletes (track and field) at the 2016 Summer Olympics
Olympic athletes of France
Olympic bronze medalists for France
Medalists at the 2012 Summer Olympics
World Athletics Championships medalists
European Athletics Championships winners
World Athletics Championships athletes for France
Olympic bronze medalists in athletics (track and field)
Athletes (track and field) at the 2020 Summer Olympics